Julio Cesar Saldaña (born 14 November 1967 in Arrecifes) is a former Argentine footballer who played as a midfielder.

During his club career in Argentina he played for Newell's Old Boys and Boca Juniors. He also played 3 games for the Argentina national football team between 1992 and 1993.

Honours

Club
Newell's Old Boys
 Argentine Primera División: 1990–91, 1992 Clausura

International
Argentina
Artemio Franchi Trophy: 1993

External links
 Career details at National Football Teams
 Newell's Player Profile

1967 births
Living people
Argentine footballers
Argentina international footballers
Newell's Old Boys footballers
Boca Juniors footballers
Argentine Primera División players
Association football midfielders
People from Arrecifes
Sportspeople from Buenos Aires Province